The National Basketball League Most Outstanding Guard is an annual National Basketball League (NBL) award given since the league's inaugural season to the best performing guard of the regular season. The winner receives the Keith Carr Trophy, which is named in honour of Carr who made the trophy himself. Carr played for the New Zealand men's national basketball team from 1948 to 1956 and was in the team when it made its first ever overseas trip to Australia in 1955.

Winners

See also
 List of National Basketball League (New Zealand) awards

References

Awards established in 1982
guard
G
1982 establishments in New Zealand